Akeley Wood School is a  coeducational private primary and secondary school, with an attached sixth form near Buckingham. It is owned by Cognita, which is an independent schools company.

The school accommodates pupils aged 12 months –18 years old albeit not on the same site – stretching efforts across three separate schools; the Junior School, Tile House Mansion and the Senior School – Akeley Wood. There are approximately 900 pupils across the three sites.

History
Akeley Wood School was originally named Hillcrest School, and located in Frinton-on-Sea. Hillcrest School moved, avoiding the war, to Wales; and, in 1946, to Akeley Wood, where it was renamed. In 1973 the school changed from a boy's boarding to a co-educational day school.

A junior division of the school was introduced, and in 1976 provision was also made for those pupils who wanted to remain at the school to take their Ordinary Levels (subsequently GCSEs). The school expanded in 1987 to accommodate a sixth form.

The school grew rapidly, requiring a new site, and in 1988 Wicken Park was purchased to run a junior school. In 1998 Tile House Mansion was purchased and the lower school was taken off site.

The Junior School includes a nursery and provides education for boys and girls aged from 12 months to 11 years. Pupils aged 11 to 13 years attend Tile House Mansion and pupils between the ages of 13 and 18 years attend the Senior School.

In May 2013 Cognita announced plans to construct a new Sixth Form centre  which was opened in September 2013. The new facilities are based in the Stable Hall and include a careers centre, seminar rooms, independent study rooms, social and recreation areas over two floors and a purpose built kitchen.

Notable former pupils

Pamela Cookey, netball player
Samuel Ricketts, footballer
Tom Stephenson, rugby player
Greig Tonks, rugby player
Andrew Selkirk, archaeologist

External links
Official website

References

Private schools in Buckinghamshire
Buckingham
Cognita